Yoshifumi Kashiwa (柏好文, Kashiwa Yoshifumi, born July 28, 1987) is a Japanese football player who plays for Sanfrecce Hiroshima.

Club statistics

1Includes Japanese Super Cup, FIFA Club World Cup and J. League Championship.

Honours

Club
Sanfrecce Hiroshima
 J.League Cup: 2022

References

External links

Profile at Sanfrecce Hiroshima

1987 births
Living people
Kokushikan University alumni
Association football people from Yamanashi Prefecture
Japanese footballers
J1 League players
J2 League players
Ventforet Kofu players
Sanfrecce Hiroshima players
Association football midfielders